The 2016 V de V Challenge Monoplace was a multi-event motor racing championship for open wheel, formula racing cars held across Europe. The championship features drivers competing in 2 litre Formula Renault single seat race cars that conform to the technical regulations for the championship. The 2016 season was the seventh V de V Challenge Monoplace season organized by the V de V Sports. The season began at Circuit de Barcelona-Catalunya on 19 March and finishes on 6 November at Estoril.		
		
The season was dominated by TS Corse driver Alex Peroni who won 14 from 21 races. Gilles Hireau and Aleksey Chuklin won one races on their way to top three in the season standings. Grégoire Saucy, Erwin Creed, Antoine Robert, Nicolas Melin, Thomas Neubauer, David Droux, Gilles Magnus, Rinus van Kalmthout and Richard Verschoor were the other drivers who was able to finish on podium during the races.

Teams and drivers

Race calendar and results

Standings

References

External links		
		
		
		
		
V de V Challenge Monoplace		
V de V Challenge Monoplace		
V de V Challenge Monoplace